"Treacherous" is a song by American singer-songwriter Taylor Swift from her fourth studio album, Red (2012). Written by Swift and its producer Dan Wilson, "Treacherous" begins with slow guitar strumming and percussion before building up into a climatic finale. The lyrics are about a narrator's attempts to protect a fragile and dangerous relationship. A demo of the song was included in the track list of Red's deluxe edition.

Music critics received "Treacherous" with positive reviews, with compliments for Swift's songwriting and the production. Upon the release of Red, it peaked at number two on the Billboard Bubbling Under Hot 100 and number 65 on the Canadian Hot 100. "Treacherous" was included on the regular set list of the Red Tour (2013–2014).

A re-recorded version, "Treacherous (Taylor's Version)", was released as part of Swift's re-recorded album Red (Taylor's Version) on November 12, 2021. The song peaked on singles charts in Australia, Canada, Singapore, and the United States, and peaked at number 42 on the Billboard Global 200.

Background and production
Swift released her third studio album, Speak Now in 2010, she wrote the album entirely by herself and co-produced it by her long time collaborator, Nathan Chapman. The album 
expands on the country pop sound of her two previous albums, with elements of radio-friendly pop that had been apparent in its predecessor Fearless (2008). On Speak Now'''s follow-up, Red, released in 2012, The goal was to experiment beyond her previous albums unexceptional country pop sound. One of the resulting collaborations was "Treacherous", which was produced by Dan Wilson who also worked on Swift's other song, "Come Back…Be Here".

Swift said in an interview with Taste of Country: "I wrote "Treacherous" with Dan Wilson, and we came up with a way to say, you know, This is dangerous and I realize that I might get hurt if I go through with this, if I move forward with you. But...but I want to. You know? It's like that kind of conflicted feeling of it being a risk every time you fall in love – especially with certain types of people." In an interview with The A.V. Club, Wilson described Swift as "full of excitement" over the writing of the song, stating that "She came to my studio super excited" and said, "I had an idea in the car." And she sang me the first three or four lines of it and said, "I want to call it "Treacherous" and maybe the chorus can go like this."

 Release and chart performance 
"Treacherous" is track three on Red, which was released on October 22, 2012 under Big Machine Records. It debuted on both the US Billboard Bubbling Under Hot 100 and the Hot Country Songs charts; reaching number two on the former and number 26 on the latter. The track peaked at number 65 on the Canadian Hot 100.

After a dispute with Big Machine over the sale of the masters of her first six studio albums, Swift re-recorded Red and released it as Red (Taylor's Version) on November 11, 2022 through Republic Records; the re-recorded version of "Treacherous" is titled "Treacherous (Taylor's Version)". The song debuted at number 54 on the US Billboard Hot 100 and number 15 on the Hot Country Songs chart. On the Global 200, it peaked at number 42. "Treacherous (Taylor's Version)" charted on single charts of Australia's Top 50 Singles chart (38), the Canadian Hot 100 (41), Singapore's Top Streaming chart (30), and the United Kingdom's Audio Streaming chart (67).

 Music and lyrics 
"Treacherous" has a duration of four minutes and two seconds. It features a slow-burning production. The song starts with mandolin, slow guitar strumming and percussion that build up into a climatic finale. As the acoustic and electric guitar intertwine, background vocals harmonize at each iteration of the refrain. In a Pitchfork review, Brad Nelson wrote that whereas the beginning is "relatively motionless, frozen in time by all the tension in Swift's voice", as the song progresses, "the guitars and drums melt into dark, wet echoes like pelting raindrops". Mary Kate Carr from The A.V. Club wrote that the song builds to a "complementary crescendo that could sweep anyone away". Sam Lansky from Idolator likened the production to that of U2's song "With or Without You" (1987), specifically due to the "aching guitars".

The lyrics are about a protagonist's attempt to protect a fragile and dangerous relationship that has broken. On the song's meaning, Swift said, "[...] I tend to feel like when you're looking back on the things that have hurt you in life, I look back on them and think if it made you feel something, it was worth it." Some critics noted the lyrics, "I’ll do anything you say / If you say it with your hands", as the first time Swift explicitly incorporate sexuality in her lyrics. Chris Willman from The Hollywood Reporter compared the song's lyrical narrative to that of Sheryl Crow's "My Favorite Mistake" (1998) and opined that the track's sensuality is also due to Swift's "nearly whispered vocals" that "neatly put across the tentativeness of her sensuality in falling for a bad boy".

Critical reception
In reviews of Red, some critics picked "Treacherous" as an album highlight. Willman said that it contains some of the most poetic lyrics on the album, and Lansky considered the musical direction of the track one of the evidences for Swift's "diversions into sonic experimentation that wouldn't fare as well on the radio, and they feel even more exciting". American Songwriter's Jewly Hight selected the song as one of the album's best examples showcasing Swift's talents at capturing emotions in tangible detail. Nelson lauded the track as a "masterclass in dynamics from arrangement to lyric", highlighting how the production complements the lyrical sentiments. Jason Lipshutz and Andrew Hampp from Billboard were not as complimentary, saying that the instrumental build-up "steers away from the hushed, confessional beauty" of the initial verses.

In retrospect, some critics have considered "Treacherous" one of Swift's better songs in her entire repertoire. Rob Sheffield, writing for Rolling Stone, ranked it as Swift's 62nd best track, stating that she "braves the ski slopes of love, with a seething acoustic guitar that finally detonates halfway though." After Red (Taylor's Version)'s release in 2022, critics regarded "Treacherous" as one of the album's highlights. Time ranked "Treacherous" as the album's second-best song, with Samantha Cooney calling it "criminally underrated" and Annabel Gutterman saying it was a "gorgeous song" and a "beautiful ballad about risking your heart when you know things might end badly". Michael Savio deemed it one of Swift's "finest, most pensive" tracks, among other Red highlights. In The A.V. Club, Mary Kate Carr said that "Treacherous" introduced a "haunting, newly mature singer-songwriter vibe" to Swift's artistry.

Live performances
"Treacherous" was first performed during Swift's Google+ live chat when she announced Red'' on August 13, 2012. Swift later performed an acoustic version of the song at her mother's property in Nashville, TN. Swift included "Treacherous" on the set list of the Red Tour (2013–2014). In 2018, She unexpectedly played the track as a "surprise song" at her Reputation Stadium Tour show in Philadelphia.

Charts

"Treacherous"

"Treacherous (Taylor's Version)"

References

Taylor Swift songs
Songs written by Taylor Swift
Songs written by Dan Wilson (musician)
Song recordings produced by Dan Wilson (musician)
2012 songs